KING FAKU KANGQUNGQUSHE, son of King Ngqungqushe kaNyawuza was the last ruling monarch of the United AmaMpondo Kingdom in Southern Africa from 1818-1867. During his reign, King Faku consolidated and unified several groups and expanded the territory he had inherited from his father. In 1844, he forged an alliance with the Cape Colony and encouraged British colonization of Natal, thus ensuring his own kingdom would have boundaries that were defined according to Western standards at the time. The kingdom was eventually annexed by the British Empire, became part of the Cape Colony and is today a section of the Eastern Cape province of South Africa.

References

Monarchs of South Africa
19th-century monarchs in Africa
19th-century South African people
1780 births
1867 deaths